Chester is a masculine given name of English origins with Latin roots.

Notable people with this name
 Chester A. Arthur (1829–1886), the 21st president of the United States
 Chester Alan Arthur II (1864–1937), son of Chester A. Arthur
 Chester "Gavin" Alan Arthur III (1901–1972), American astrologer and sexologist and a grandson of Chester A. Arthur
 Chester Chet Atkins (1924–2001), American musician
 Chester W. Barrows (1872–1931), Justice of the Rhode Island Supreme Court
 Chester Bennington (1976–2017), the lead vocalist of the rock band Linkin Park
 Chester Brown (born 1960), Canadian alternative cartoonist and, since 2008, the Libertarian Party of Canada's candidate for the riding of Trinity-Spadina in Toronto, Canada
 Chester Burnett (1910–1976), known as Howlin' Wolf, American blues singer, guitarist and harmonica player
 Chester Carlson (1906–1968), American physicist, inventor, and patent attorney
 Chester C. Chattin (1909–1979), Justice of the Tennessee Supreme Court
 Chester Conklin (1886–1971), American comedian and actor
 Chester Conn (1894–1973), American composer of popular music
 Chester Crocker (born 1941), American diplomat
 Chester Cruikshank (1913–1970), American athlete
 Chester Dale (1883–1962), American banker, major donor to the National Gallery of Art, Washington DC
 Chester Gould (1900–1985), American cartoonist, best known as the creator of the Dick Tracy comic strip
 Chester Himes (1909–1984), American writer, author of If He Hollers Let Him Go
 Chester E. Holifield (1903–1995), United States Representative from California
 Chester Kallman (1921–1975), American writer
 Chester Ludgin (1925–2003), American operatic baritone
 Chester Manifold (1867–1918), Australian politician and philanthropist.
 Chester Morris (1901–1970), American actor, who starred in the Boston Blackie detective series of the 1940s
 Chester W. Nimitz (1885–1966), American five-star admiral
 Chester Novell Turner, African-American filmmaker
 Chester See (born 1983), American musician, actor and YouTube personality
 Chester Stiles (September 14th, 1970) Filmed himself molesting a three-year-old girl and was sentence to 21 terms of life in prison with the possibility of parole after 140 years
 Chester Taylor (born 1979), American football running back of the National Football League who is currently on the Arizona Cardinals
 Chester Thompson (born 1948), American drummer and session musician
 Chester Williams (1970–2019), former South African rugby union rugby player
 Chester Sidney Williams (1907–1992), American educator and author who wrote extensively about education and freedoms

Fictional characters
 Chester Barklight, playable character in the role-playing game Tales of Phantasia
 Chester Cheetah, mascot for cheese-flavored snack brand Cheetos
 Chester Goode in TV series Gunsmoke
 Chester McBadbat in The Fairly OddParents
 Chester McTech, a character in the American animated children's television program Beverly Hills Teens
 Chester Tate, a character in TV series Soap
 Chester, also known as Kid Rot, a character in Grossology.
 Chester the Molester, cartoon character in Hustler magazine
 Chester the Terrier, cartoon character in the Warner Bros. Looney Tunes/Merrie Melodies series

References

Masculine given names
English masculine given names